Hugh Jacobson (20 February 1903 – 1974) was an English professional footballer who played as a full-back.

References

1903 births
1974 deaths
Footballers from Northumberland
English footballers
Association football fullbacks
Newbiggin Athletic F.C. players
Blyth Spartans A.F.C. players
Grimsby Town F.C. players
Doncaster Rovers F.C. players
English Football League players